Jean-Marc Michaud (October 24, 1923 – August 26, 2008) was a Canadian politician. He served in the Legislative Assembly of New Brunswick from 1960 to 1963 as a member of the Liberal party. He is the son of Joseph-Enoil Michaud, who served in the Canadian Parliament.

References

1923 births
2008 deaths
New Brunswick Liberal Association MLAs